William Larson (1942–2019) was an American conceptual photographer.

Bill or William Larson may also refer to:

Bill Larson (fullback) (1938–2015), American football fullback
Bill Larson (born 1953), American football tight end

See also
William Larsson (1873–1926), Swedish silent film actor
William Larsen (disambiguation)